Paolo Marini (18th century) was an Italian painter. He was born in San Severino. He is noted as a painter in the apse of the church of San Filippo, San Severino Marche. He also painted for the church of Santa Maria del Gloriosi near San Severino.

References

18th-century Italian painters
Italian male painters
Year of death missing
People from le Marche
18th-century Italian male artists